The 2000 Baton Rouge mayoral election was held on October 7 and November 7, 2000, to elect the mayor-president of Baton Rouge, Louisiana. It saw the election of Bobby Ray Simpson. , this was the last time a Republican was elected mayor-president.

Results

First round

Runoff

References 

2000 Louisiana elections
2000
Baton Rouge